Oesel Choeling Monastery is a Buddhist monastery in Bhutan. It is located in the village of Rangjung, on the left bank of the Gamri Chhu, approximately 16 kilometres from Trashigang. The monastery was built in 1990 by Garab Rinpoche. Austrian influence in the area has also funded a hydroelectric plant.

References

Buddhist monasteries in Bhutan
Tibetan Buddhist monasteries
Buildings and structures completed in 1990